Netolice is a town in Prachatice District in the South Bohemian Region of the Czech Republic. It has about 2,500 inhabitants. The town centre is well preserved and is protected by law as an urban monument zone.

Administrative parts

The village of Petrův Dvůr is an administrative part of Netolice.

Geography
It lies in the Bohemian Forest Foothills. The Bezdrevský Stream flows through the town. The territory is rich in fish ponds.

History
The Slavic tribe settled the area probably already in the 8th century and was one of the first in Bohemia. The first written mention of Netolice is from 981, after the castle in Netolice was mentioned in Chronica Boemorum. After the massacre of Slavník dynasty in 995, the Netolice castle became the property of the ruling Přemyslid dynasty. The settlement was established below the castle around the Church of Saint Wenceslaus. Netolice became the administrative and trade centre of the region for its location on the crossroads of important trade routes.

Sights

Netolice is known for Kratochvíle castle, located in Petrův Dvůr village. It is a Renaissance castle from 1583, built as a hunting castle for William of Rosenberg in the style of Italian villas.

The historic core of Netolice is an urban monument zone. The most valuable monuments are the town hall building and two churches. The town hall is the main landmark of the town square. It is a Neo-Renaissance building from 1869. The Baroque fountain on the square is from 1677.

Church of Saint Wenceslaus is originally a Gothic building with Romanesque elements. It was built in the second half of the 13th century and has a Renaissance tower. Church of the Assumption of the Virgin Mary was also built in the second half of the 13th century. In the 17th century, early Baroque reconstructions were made.

The pond Mnich was founded in 15th–16th century. There are two historically valuable stone arch bridges in the dam.

Notable people
Josef Štěpánek Netolický (c. 1460–1539), fishpond builder and architect

Twin towns – sister cities

Netolice is twinned with:
 Ringelai, Germany

Gallery

References

External links

 

Cities and towns in the Czech Republic
Populated places in Prachatice District
Prácheňsko